Madeleine Baran is an American investigative journalist. She is best known as the lead reporter for the APM podcast In the Dark. She has received accolades including three Peabody Awards, a Gracie Award and two Sigma Delta Chi Awards for her reporting.

Life and career 
Baran is from Milwaukee. She studied at Hampshire College and New York University, where she received a master’s degree in journalism and French studies.

Baran worked at Minnesota Public Radio (MPR) for six-and-half years. In 2013 and 2014, she led MPR’s coverage of the Archdiocese of St. Paul and Minneapolis’ sex abuse scandals in a radio documentary Betrayed by Silence. Her reporting led to the resignation of the archbishop, criminal charges against the archdiocese, and lawsuits by victims of clergy sex abuse. She received a Peabody Award and a 2014 Gracie Award for Outstanding Investigative Program or Feature for the coverage.

Baran is the host and lead reporter of the podcast In the Dark, produced by American Public Media. It was named one of "The Best New Podcasts of 2016" by The New York Times. In 2020, season 2 of In the Dark won the Radio Silver Gavel Award from the American Bar Association and Baran received the Alfred I. duPont–Columbia University Award for excellence in journalism in the public service (2020). Seasons one and two of In the Dark each received a Peabody Award.

References

External links 
 Madeleine Baran on American Public Media

Year of birth missing (living people)
Living people
American investigative journalists
New York University alumni
Minnesota Public Radio people
People from Milwaukee
Journalists from Wisconsin
American women journalists
21st-century American journalists
Peabody Award winners
Hampshire College alumni
21st-century American women